Benediktbeuern station is a railway station in the municipality of Benediktbeuern, in Bavaria, Germany. It is located on the Kochelsee line of Deutsche Bahn.

Services
 the following services stop at Benediktbeuern:

References

External links
 
 Benediktbeuern layout 
 

Railway stations in Bavaria
Buildings and structures in Bad Tölz-Wolfratshausen